Hate-watching is the activity of watching a television show (or film) with the intention of acquiring amusement from the mockery of its content or subject. Closely related to anti-fan behaviours, viewers who partake in hate-watching derive pleasure and entertainment from a show's absurdities or failures. The act of hate-watching is premised on the audience engaging with a television text through a satirical lens.

Relationship with anti-fan culture 
Contrary to typical fan behaviour where audience members consume a television text with the intent to acquire pleasure from its contents, the pleasure anti-fans derive from a text is rooted in its inferiority.

In a study conducted in 2005 on Television Without Pity, a since-defunct website that hosted discussions about television shows, Gray points out the patterns of anti-fan behaviours exhibited by its users. Unlike individuals who participate in fandom culture out of love for a particular text, anti-fans engage with a text out of dislike for it. The forums hosted on Television Without Pity expressed anti-fan sentiments where users would watch a television show, often critiquing and pointing out its perceived shortcomings.

History 
A 2012 article from The New Yorker described the short-lived Studio 60 on the Sunset Strip as a show people loved to hate-watch, as "it was bad in a truly spectacular way—you could learn something from it, about self-righteous TV speechifying and failed satire and the dangers of letting a brilliant showrunner like [Aaron] Sorkin run loose to settle all his grudges in fictional form".

Entertainment Weekly and other publications noted the difference between hate-watching and watching as a guilty pleasure. "You wouldn't tune in every week to hate-watch a really bad reality show — that's a guilty pleasure. Generally speaking, hate-watching requires a TV series with high ambitions and features a certain amount of aesthetic perfection".

In a Los Angeles Times article describing the complexity of effects of U.S. presidential candidate Donald Trump's appearance on Saturday Night Live as host, writer Mary McNamara references the hate-watching phenomenon as a reason that ratings alone are not an indication of support. An article from The New York Times also pointed out the successful ratings for Trump's presidency.

On a February 2020 article, Spanish television reviewer Borja Terán described the concept of hate-watching as "audience enjoying watching shows to be able to criticize them", citing it as part of the reason behind the success of Telecinco and its reality show-based lineup (specifically mentioning Supervivientes, the nineteenth season of which had premiered the night prior to the post): "the viewer feels superior to the guinea pigs taking part in the televised competition. They feel better with themselves and evade from personal problems by spending energy torpedoing a mere entertainment they follow through a screen."

As the term gained popularity many anti-fans have begged others to not hate-watch, as they believe doing so will have the unintended effect of making the media they dislike seem more popular than if they had not hate-watched. Velma is one such example of this phenomenon, where hate-watching is supposedly the lead cause of the show being renewed for a second season.

Examples of hate-watching shows 
13 Reasons Why
The Big Bang Theory
Chrisley Knows Best
Emily in Paris
Entourage
Euphoria
Family Guy
Studio 60 on the Sunset Strip
Game of Thrones
Girls
Glee
House Hunters
Keeping Up with the Kardashians
Love Island
Pretty Little Liars
Riverdale
Say Yes to the Dress
Singapore Social
Smash
Supervivientes
The Millionaire Matchmaker
The Newsroom
The Simpsons
True Blood
Velma
Vinyl

See also
Anti-fan
List of television shows considered the worst
Quality television
Binge-watching
Golden Age of Television (2000s–present), where the term originated
Cinephilia
Doomscrolling

References

External links 
Hate Watching Is Still Watching: How Shock Value Changes TV
Hope-watching vs. hate-watching in TV's new golden age
Data Proves TV Viewers Love to Hate-Watch Shows — Variety

American English words
Popular culture neologisms
Television terminology
Hatred
2010s neologisms
Media studies
Film and video fandom
2000s in television
2010s in television
2020s in television